Mont Tondu is a mountain of Savoie, France.

References

Mountains of the Alps
Alpine three-thousanders
Mountains of Savoie
Mountains of Haute-Savoie